Baranovka is a rural locality (a selo) in Petruninskoye Rural Settlement, Kamyshinsky District, Volgograd Oblast, Russia. The population was 466 as of 2010. There are 11 streets.

Geography 
Baranovka is located on the Volga Upland, on the Ilovlya River, 26 km northwest of Kamyshin (the district's administrative centre) by road. Petrov Val is the nearest rural locality.

References 

Rural localities in Kamyshinsky District